South Early College High School (SECHS), formerly Empowerment South Early College High School and Empowerment College Preparatory High School, is a college-preparatory high school in Houston, Texas, US. It is a part of the Houston Independent School District. It was previously located on the campus of Albert Thomas Middle School and then at Jones High School 

The school opened in August 2005. Empowerment merged with South Early College High School in 2010.

Its current location, at 1930 Airport Boulevard, is on the South Campus of Houston Community College began construction in 2014 and opened in August 2016.

The school offers its students the opportunity to earn an associate degree while concurrently achieving a high school degree.

See also

 Houston A+ Challenge

References

External links
 Official website
 Empowerment College Preparatory High School (Archive)
 Houston A+ Challenge

Houston Independent School District high schools
Public high schools in Houston
Educational institutions established in 2005
Early College High Schools
2005 establishments in Texas